Tessellarctia walterei is a moth in the family Erebidae. It was described by Carlos Rommel Beutelspacher in 1984. It is found in Mexico.

References

Moths described in 1984
Phaegopterina